Tonsa, or Tonsa Peak, is a  mountain summit located on the border of Alberta and British Columbia on the Continental Divide in the Canadian Rockies. The mountain forms part of the backdrop to Moraine Lake in the Valley of the Ten Peaks of Banff National Park. It was named in 1894 by Samuel E.S. Allen for the Stoney Indian word for the number four.

Geology

Like other mountains in Banff Park, Tonsa is composed of sedimentary rock laid down during the Precambrian to Jurassic periods. Formed in shallow seas, this sedimentary rock was pushed east and over the top of younger rock during the Laramide orogeny.

Climate
Based on the Köppen climate classification, Tonsa is located in a subarctic climate zone with cold, snowy winters, and mild summers. Winter temperatures can drop below −20 °C with wind chill factors below −30 °C. Precipitation runoff from Tonsa drains east into tributaries of the Bow River, or west into tributaries of the Vermilion River.

See also
List of peaks on the British Columbia–Alberta border
Geography of Alberta
Geography of British Columbia

References

Gallery

External links
 Parks Canada web site: Banff National Park
 Parks Canada web site: Kootenay National Park
 Tonsa weather: Mountain Forecast

Three-thousanders of Alberta
Three-thousanders of British Columbia
Mountains of Banff National Park
Alberta's Rockies